Gibberula chudeaui is a species of very small sea snail, a marine gastropod mollusk or micromollusk in the family Cystiscidae.

Description

Distribution
This species occurs off the Banc d'Arguin in the North Atlantic Ocean.

References

 Wolff, W.J.; Duiven, P.; Esselink, P.; Gueve, A. (1993). Biomass of macrobenthic tidal flat fauna of the Banc d'Arguin, Mauritania. Hydrobiologia 258(1–3): 151–163

External links
 Dautzenberg P. (1910). Contribution à la faune malacologique de l'Afrique occidentale. Actes de la Société Linnéenne de Bordeaux. 64: 47-228, pls 1-4

Cystiscidae
Gastropods described in 1910